Allogymnopleurus is a genus of scarab beetles in the tribe Gymnopleurini. It includes 20 species; 17 are restricted to the Afrotropics, one is Afrotropical/Palearctic, and two Oriental.

Characters
These include:
A suture where the thorax joins the abdomen which is clearly visible (from above) at the edge of the elytra
A single terminal spur on each mesotibia
The anterior edge of the clypeus is quadridentate or sexdentate (four or six teeth on the front edge of the head)
Length ranges from 8.1 to 18.2 mm

Gallery

References

Scarabaeinae